Oko is a Russian satellite-based missile detection and early warning system. The system has used a total of 101 satellites, which were launched between 1972 and 2012. Eighty six US-K satellites, operated in semisynchronous elliptical molniya orbits, were launched by Molniya-M carrier rockets with Blok 2BL upper stages, whilst the geostationary part of the system was served by seven US-KS and eight US-KMO satellites, launched using Proton-K carrier rockets with Blok DM and DM-2 upper stages.

References

Satellites
Lists of satellites